Eletise Fiatoa (born July 31, 1954) is an American gridiron football defensive tackle who played in the Canadian Football League.

Fiatoa was born on Oahu, Hawaii. Fiatoa played his college football at California State University, Long Beach, where he was a defensive tackle. He was recruited for the Montreal Alouettes by defensive end Junior Ah You. He played 6 games for the Alouettes in 1978.

References

Montreal Alouettes players
American sportspeople of Samoan descent
Players of American football from Hawaii
Living people
1954 births
Long Beach State 49ers football players
American players of Canadian football
Canadian football defensive linemen
American football defensive tackles